Popei 泼佩 is a Loloish language spoken in Huaping County, Yunnan, China. In Huaping County, it is spoken by about 1,000 people in several villages. Popei is also spoken in Dayao and Yongren Counties, as well as small pockets in nearby regions.

References

Loloish languages
Languages of China